Tiv or TIV may refer to:
 Tendency for Interpersonal Victimhood, a recently proposed personality disorder
 Tiv people, an ethnic nation in West Africa
 Tiv language, a Southern Bantoid language
 Time-invariant system
 Tornado Intercept Vehicle
 Trivalent influenza vaccine
 Turbine installation vessel
 T-IV mine, a Soviet anti-tank mine
 Fokker T.IV, a Dutch torpedo bomber/maritime reconnaissance floatplane
 Tivat Airport, by IATA airport code
 Total insurable value, a value of property, inventory, equipment, and business income covered in an insurance policy

People with the name
 Tiv (illustrator), a female South Korean illustrator who currently lives in Japan.
 Tiv, an ethnic group in Nigeria, live in the central-eastern state of Taraba in the valley of the Benue River and neighboring states, constitute of 2.4% of Nigeria’s total population.
 Tiv Ol, Cambodian teacher and communist politician

Language and nationality disambiguation pages